Romolo Guerrieri, aka Romolo Girolami (born 5 December 1931) is an Italian film director and screenwriter. He directed 17 films between 1961 and 1992.

Selected filmography

Director
 Ten Thousand Dollars for a Massacre (1966)
 Johnny Yuma (1966)
 The Sweet Body of Deborah (1968)
 Detective Belli (1969)
 The Divorce (1970)
 The Double (1971)
 The Police Serve the Citizens? (1973)
 Salvo D'Acquisto (1974)
 Young, Violent, Dangerous (1976)
 Covert Action (1978)
 La gorilla (1982)
 The Final Executioner (1984)

Screenwriter

 Any Gun Can Play (1967)
 Cornetti alla crema (1981)
 Occhio, malocchio, prezzemolo e finocchio (1983)
 Trainer on the Beach (1984)

References

External links

1931 births
Living people
Writers from Rome
Italian film directors
Italian screenwriters
Italian male screenwriters
Poliziotteschi directors